Marchawari Rural Municipality (Nepali :मर्चवारीमाई गाउँपालिका) is a Gaunpalika in Rupandehi District in Lumbini Province of Nepal. On 12 March 2017, the government of Nepal implemented a new local administrative structure, with the implementation of the new local administrative structure, VDCs have been replaced with municipal and Village Councils. Marchawari is one of these 753 local units.

See also 

 People's Progressive Party, Nepal

References 

Populated places in Rupandehi District
Rural municipalities of Nepal established in 2017